Hung Hei-gun or Hong Xiguan (1745—1825) was a Chinese martial artist who lived in the Qing dynasty. He was also an influential figure in the Southern Shaolin school of Chinese martial arts. His name is also alternatively romanised as Hung Hei-koon, Hung Hei-kwun, Hung Hsi-kuan, and similar renditions. He was believed to be the creator and founder of Hung Ga Kuen.

Life
Hung was originally a tea merchant. He escaped to the Southern Shaolin Monastery in Fujian Province after having an argument with Manchus elites. The abbot, Jee-sin, accepted him into the monastery and soon found out how talented and hardworking he was in Southern Shaolin martial arts. Jee-sin was impressed by these qualities and soon began to teach Hung the Black Tiger Fist that he specialised in. After six years, Hung became the best among the "lay" members of Southern Shaolin Monastery. These "lay" members refer to people who learnt Southern Shaolin martial arts but were not ordained as monks in the monastery. However, Qing government forces destroyed Southern Shaolin Monastery later because the monastery provided refuge for many rebels seeking to overthrow the Qing dynasty.

Students
Hung had two notable students: Luk Ah-choi (陸阿采) and Lei Jou-fan (李祖寬). Luk learnt Southern Shaolin martial arts from both Hung and Hung's master, Reverend Jee-sin. He founded the Hung Ga (洪家) style of martial arts, which he named after the Hung-mun (洪門), a Chinese fraternal organisation that was associated with the anti-Qing revolutionary movement. Lei founded the Hung Fut (洪佛) style of martial arts.

Cultural references
Donnie Yen portrayed Hung in the 1994 Hong Kong television series The Kung Fu Master, which was produced by ATV and based on legends about Hung and Fong Sai-yuk. Jet Li also portrayed Hung in the 1994 Hong Kong film The New Legend of Shaolin, which was loosely based on Hung's life and incorporated elements from the Japanese manga Lone Wolf and Cub.

Chen Kuan-tai portrayed Hung in the 1977 Shaw Brothers film, Executioners from Shaolin, directed by Lau Kar-leung.

See also
 Hung Ga
 Hung Fut
 Jee Sin Sim See

References

Beginning Shaolin Hung-Gar Kung Fu - John Leong 
Hung Gar Kung Fu: Chinese art of self defense - Bucksam Kong and Eugene H. Ho, copyright 1973 Ohara Publications Inc.
The Tiger/Crane Form of Hung Gar Kung Fu - Bucksam Kong, copyright 1983 Ohara Publications Inc.
Kung Fu Magazine - Sept.1999, Pacific Rim publications, Arnaldo Ty Nunez

1745 births
1825 deaths
Buddhist folklore
Chinese folklore
Chinese Hung Gar practitioners
People from Huadu District
Qing dynasty Buddhists
Sportspeople from Guangzhou
Buddhism in China
18th-century Chinese people
19th-century Chinese people